Clinidium hammondi is a species of ground beetle in the subfamily Rhysodinae. It was described by R.T. & J.R. Bell in 1985. It is named for Peter Hammond from the British Museum of Natural History. The holotype originates from Bogota, Colombia,  and measures  in length.

References

Clinidium
Beetles of South America
Arthropods of Colombia
Beetles described in 1985